Nanchana Halli Palaya or N.H.Palaya is a suburb of Mysore city in Karnataka province of India.

Location
N.H.Palaya is located on Mananthavady Road at a distance of two kilometres from Mysore.

Education
GHPS Urdu School is the only educational facility of the slum village.

Post Office
There is a post office in the village with the postal code 570008.

References

Mysore South
Suburbs of Mysore